Glina is a commune in the south-east of Ilfov county, Muntenia, Romania. Its name is derived from Slavic Glina, meaning "clay". It is composed of three villages: Cățelu, Glina and Manolache.

The commune is the site of the Glina sewage treatment plant.

Cățelu is the site of Battery 9–10, the best known – and most visited – former military fort from a defensive circle of fortifications surrounding Bucharest that was built in the late 19th century, during the reign of King Carol I.

References

Communes in Ilfov County
Localities in Muntenia
Place names of Slavic origin in Romania